Wenno von Rohrbach, also known as Winno, Vinno, and Winne, was the first Master (Herrenmeister) of the Livonian Brothers of the Sword, leading the Order from 1204 to 1209.

Death 
Originally from Kassel-Naumburg, Wenno was killed by the knight  with an axe, in a quarrel caused by some unknown reason. As a result, Wickbert was sentenced to death. Wenno was succeeded by Volkwin Schenk.

References 

1209 deaths
Masters of the Livonian Brothers of the Sword
Christians of the Livonian Crusade
Axe murder